Jonathan Koppell is the President of Montclair State University, Montclair New Jersey. He previously served as dean of the Watts College of Public Service & Community Solutions and Provost for Public Service and Social Impact at Arizona State University.

Education 
Koppell holds a bachelor's degree from Harvard University and both a doctorate and master's degree from the University of California at Berkeley. His career in public service began as a Research Assistant with the Office of Federal Housing Enterprise Oversight in Washington, D.C. from 1993-1995. In 1999, Koppell served as a Guest Scholar at the Brookings Institution while simultaneously holding the title of Markle Fellow of the New America Foundation.

Career
In 2003, Koppell served as Fulbright Lecturer and Professor of Public Administration and Public Policy at Fudan University in Shanghai, China. In 2006, Koppell was named an associate professor at Yale University of Political Science and the Director of the university’s Millstein Center for Corporate Governance and Performance. Koppell became Chairman of the City of New Haven, Connecticut Development Commission in 2008. In 2012 the National Academy of Public Administration chose Koppell as one of its nearly 800 Fellows.

Koppell joined Arizona State University in 2010 as Director of the School of Public Affairs. In 2011, he became  Dean of the College of Public Service & Community Solutions at Arizona State University, succeeding Debra Friedman. In 2015, Koppell launched the Public Service Academy at ASU, a four-year program of classes, hands-on experiences and internships to create working relationships between civilians and military personnel and collaborations among the public, private and non-profit sectors. In 2018, his college gained the prefix "Watts" after a $30 million dollar donation from Mike and Cindy Watts.

In 2021, Koppell became President of Montclair State University, succeeding President Susan A. Cole.

Academic work 
Koppell has conducted research related to the structure and administration of complex organizations, corporate governance, financial regulation, and government involvement in for-profit enterprise.

He is the author of two books:
 World Rule: Legitimacy, Accountability and the Design of Global Governance (2010) 
 The Politics of Quasi-Government: Hybrid Organizations and the Dynamics of Bureaucratic Control (2003)

References 

Living people
1970 births
Harvard University alumni
University of California, Berkeley alumni
Arizona State University faculty
Public administration scholars
Fellows of the United States National Academy of Public Administration